Lake Cuitzeo is a lake in the central part of Mexico, in the state of Michoacán. The lake is astatic, meaning the volume and level of water in the lake fluctuates frequently. It is the second-largest freshwater lake in Mexico.

Lake Cuitzeo lies in an endorheic basin, which does not drain to the sea, although in prehistoric times the lake may well have overflowed during periods of increased inflow, since the lowest point on its rim is only 10–20 meters above the current maximum elevation of the lake's surface. Michoacán's capital, Morelia, lies in the Cuitzeo basin south of the lake. The basin of the Lerma River lies to the east and north, and the basin of the Balsas River lies to the south, separated by the mountains of the Trans-Mexican Volcanic Belt. The endorheic basin of Lake Pátzcuaro lies to the west.

The lake is irregular in shape, with northern, western, and eastern sections connected by a central marshy area, which receives the main freshwater inflows. It has no natural outflow, but an outflow canal was cut to the north at the low point in the basin's rim, allowing the lake to drain via Lake Yuriria into the Lerma River when the water level is high; this limits the elevation of the lake to 1830 meters. The western section was divided in two by the construction of north-south highways. The western portion is saltier, and sustains unusual fisheries of clam shrimps (Eocyzicus digueti and Leptestheria compleximanus), as well as hemipterans, and ephydrids. The lake basin is the only habitat for Thamnophis eques cuitzeoensis, a subspecies of the essentially harmless, semi-aquatic Mexican garter snake.

The three main inflows to the lake are the Viejo de Morelia, Grande de Morelia, and Querendaro rivers. These rivers originate in the mountains to the south, and sustain an irrigated agricultural area south of the lake, entering the central portion of the lake as irrigation canals. The main crops are maize, cotton, and coffee.

About 40 percent of the basin is agricultural fields, 15 percent is pasture, 20 percent is pine-oak forests, and 15 percent is tropical dry forest. The pine-oak forests lie at higher elevations, and are part of the Trans-Mexican Volcanic Belt pine-oak forests ecoregion. The Bajío dry forests ecoregion covers the lower-lying parts of the basin, extending north into the basin of the Lerma River.

Sports 

The lake has different small island with prehispanic remains, one of the islands was used as a prehispanic cemetery. It is a perfect place for bird watching, in winter many different migratory species can be seen. It is also a beautiful lake to practice kayaking in the southeast shore, there is a convenient fishermen entrance at 19°53'16"N 100°55'05"W following a land road from the town of San Bernardo. This town is 13 km west from the entrance of Morelia's International airport following the free road to Zinapecuaro.

References

Sources

External links

Cuitzeo
Cuitzeo
Landforms of Michoacán
Landforms of Guanajuato
Trans-Mexican Volcanic Belt
Important Bird Areas of Mexico